Grace Human (née Black) was an English socialist.

She was the daughter of the solicitor David Black (1817–1892), afterwards town clerk and coroner, and his wife, Clara Maria Patten (1825–1875), daughter of painter George Patten. Her brother was the mathematician Arthur Black, and her sisters were translator Constance Garnett, labour organiser and novelist Clementina Black, and painter Emma Black.

She was part of the social circle of George Bernard Shaw, and married the socialist engineer Edwin Human.

References 

British socialists
English socialists
19th-century British women
Year of birth missing
Year of death missing